Making Waves Academy is a charter school located in Richmond, California, United States. It started in 2007, and has a middle school and high school.

References

External links 
 

Schools in Contra Costa County, California
Richmond, California
Charter preparatory schools in California
Bay Counties League
Educational institutions established in 2007
2007 establishments in California